Aussiedraco is a genus of targaryendraconian pterodactyloid pterosaur from the early Cretaceous of Australia.

Description
Aussiedraco is known from holotype QM F10613, a partial mandibular symphysis housed at the Queensland Museum, recovered from rocks of the Toolebuc Formation, about 70 km east of Boulia, western Queensland, dating to Albian stage. It was named by Alexander W.A. Kellner, Taissa Rodrigues and Fabiana R. Costa in 2011 and the type species is Aussiedraco molnari. The generic name is derived from "Aussie", a shortened form of Australian, and "draco", from Latin meaning dragon. The specific epithet honours Ralph E. Molnar, who first described the specimen in 1980.

The symphysis fragment is 88 millimetres long and very straight and narrow, with a lanceolate not-expanded tip and triangular cross-section. It lacks a keel or crest and is convex on top, with a median narrow deep groove not reaching the tip, but flat at the bottom. As far as can be judged from the empty elliptical tooth-sockets, the lower jaws carry at least five pairs of teeth, which are rather large and become more outwards inclining and procumbent towards the front. Aussiedraco is estimated to have been smaller in size than Mythunga, a pterosaur from the same formation.

Classification
Kellner et al. assigned Aussiedraco to the Pteranodontoidea, a clade roughly containing the same species as the Ornithocheiroidea sensu Unwin. Aussiedraco would be closely related to the Anhangueridae. Pêgas et al. (2019) recovered Aussiedraco as a member of the lanceodontian clade Targaryendraconia.

Below is a cladogram following Pêgas et al. (2019). In the analyses, they recovered Aussiedraco within the family Targaryendraconidae of the larger clade Targaryendraconia.

See also
 Timeline of pterosaur research

References

Early Cretaceous pterosaurs
Pteranodontoids
Early Cretaceous reptiles of Australia
Fossil taxa described in 2011
Pterosaurs of Australia
Taxa named by Alexander Kellner